The list of Turkmenistan-related articles is below

General 
Emblem of Turkmenistan - Flag of Turkmenistan - National symbols of Turkmenistan - Outline of Turkmenistan - Turkmen - Turkmenistan

Culture 

Akhal-Teke
Ashgabat cinema
Central Asian Shepherd Dog
Cinema of Turkmenistan
Exhibition Hall of the Ministry of Culture
Hero of Turkmenistan
Jigit
List of Turkmenistan films
List of World Heritage Sites in Turkmenistan
Melon Day
Public holidays in Turkmenistan
Ruhnama
State Academy of Arts of Turkmenistan
State Russian Drama Theatre named after Pushkin
Turkmen carpet
Turkmen Carpet Museum
Turkmen cuisine
Turkmen language
Turkmen Museum of Fine Arts
Turkmen National Theatre of Youth
Turkmen Puppet Theatre
Turkmen State Circus
Turkmenistan Cultural Centre
World of Turkmenbashi Tales
Yomut carpet

Literature

Book of Dede Korkut (Gorkut Ata)
Döwletmämmet Azady
Gurbannazar Ezizow
Epic of Görogly
Berdi Kerbabayev
Magtymguly Pyragy
Turkmen alphabet

Mass Media

Altyn Asyr (electronic newspaper)
Altyn Asyr (TV channel)
Balkan
Miras (TV channel)
Neytralny Turkmenistan
Sport (Turkmen TV channel)
Television in Turkmenistan
Türkmen Owazy
Turkmenistan State News Agency
Turkmenistan (TV channel)
Turkmenportal

Music

Annagul Annakuliyeva
Ashkhabad (band)
Bagshy
Sergey Balasanian
Nury Halmammedov
Maya Kuliyeva
Jeren Kurbanklycheva
Weli Muhadow
Danatar Ovezov
Mähri Pirgulyýewa
Medeniyet Shahberdiyeva
Adrian Shaposhnikov
Turkmenistan State Symphony Orchestra
Iraida Yusupova

Demographics 

Ali Ili
Armenians in Central Asia
Azerbaijanis in Turkmenistan
Baloch of Turkmenistan
Chowdur
Ersari
Iranian Turkmens 
Karakalpaks
Kazakhs
Koryo-saram
Kurds in Turkmenistan
Oghuz Turks
Russians in Turkmenistan
Teke (Turkmen tribe)
Turkic languages
Turkic peoples
Turkmen language
Turkmen Sahra
Turkmen tribes
Turkmenization
Turkmens in Afghanistan
Turkmens
Turkomans
Turks in Turkmenistan
Uzbeks
Women in Turkmenistan
Yomut
Yörük

Economy 

Agriculture in Turkmenistan
Altyn Asyr bazaar
Altyn Asyr (mobile operator)
Archabil Hotel Ashgabat
Ashgabat City Telephone Network
Awaza Convention Center
Central Bank of Turkmenistan
Communications in Turkmenistan
Fishing industry in Turkmenistan
Gazprom
Grand Turkmen Hotel
Iran–Turkmenistan Friendship Dam
Oguzkent Hotel
Polimeks
Russian Bazaar, Ashgabat
Serdar Hotel
Telecommunications in Turkmenistan
Tourism in Turkmenistan
Türkmengaz
Turkmen manat
Türkmennebit
Turkmentelecom
Tuyamuyun Hydro Complex 
Yacht Club Yelken
Yyldyz Hotel

Natural gas fields

Bagtyýarlyk PSA Territory 
Dauletabad gas field
Galkynysh Gas Field (formerly Ýolöten Gas Field)
Malai Gas Field
Saman-Depe Gas Field
Shatlyk Gas Field

Natural gas pipelines

Central Asia–Center gas pipeline system
Central Asia–China gas pipeline
Dauletabad–Sarakhs–Khangiran pipeline
East–West pipeline
Korpeje–Kordkuy pipeline
Trans-Caspian Gas Pipeline
Turkmenistan–Afghanistan–Pakistan–India Pipeline

Transportation

Ashgabat International Airport
Atamyrat-Kerkichi Bridge
Balkanabat Airport
Daşoguz Airport
International Passenger Bus Terminal of Ashgabat
International North–South Transport Corridor
Lapis Lazuli corridor
List of defunct airlines of Turkmenistan
List of airlines of Turkmenistan
List of airports in Turkmenistan
List of railway stations in Turkmenistan
List of Turkmenistan Airlines destinations
Mary International Airport
M37 highway (Turkmenistan)
North-South Transnational Railway Corridor
Ports and harbours in Turkmenistan
Rail transport in Turkmenistan
The State Service of Maritime and River Transportation of Turkmenistan
Trans-Caspian Railway
Trans-Karakum Railway
Trolleybuses in Ashgabat
Turkmenabat International Airport
Turkmenbashi International Airport
Turkmenbashi International Seaport
Turkmenistan Airlines
Türkmendemirýollary
Türkmenderýaýollary

Education and science 
 

Academy of Sciences of Turkmenistan 
TürkmenÄlem 52°E / MonacoSAT 
Turkmenistan Memorial Capsule 
Turkmenistan National Space Agency

Archeological sites

Abiward
Altyndepe
Anau culture
Anau, Turkmenistan
Bactria–Margiana Archaeological Complex
Cave of Dzhebel
Dayahatyn
Dehistan/Mishrian
Dev-Kesken
Gonur Depe
Jeitun
Konye-Urgench
Kutlug Timur Minaret
Margiana
Merv
Monjukli Depe
Namazga-Tepe
Nisa, Turkmenistan
Togolok
Ulug Depe

Libraries
Mary Library - State Library of Turkmenistan

Schools
Ashgabat International School - Berdimuhamed Annayev 1st Specialized Military School - Diller Dunyasi language center - Gujurly Nesil

Paleontology
Danata Formation - Kugitang Svita - Kurek Formation - Turkmenidae

Universities

Institute of International Relations (Turkmenistan)
International Oil and Gas University
International University of Humanities and Development
List of universities in Turkmenistan
State Academy of Arts of Turkmenistan
Turkmen Agricultural University Named after S.A. Niyazov
Turkmen military academies
Turkmen National Conservatory
Turkmen State Border Service Institute
Turkmen State Institute of Architecture and Construction
Turkmen State Institute of Economics and Management
Turkmen State Medical University

Environment

Ecoregions

List of ecoregions in Turkmenistan
Alai–Western Tian Shan steppe
Badghyz and Karabil semi-desert
Caspian lowland desert
Central Asian riparian woodlands
Central Asian southern desert
Kopet Dag semi-desert
Kopet Dag woodlands and forest steppe

Fauna

Wildlife

Acalyptris brevis
Acalyptris egidijui
Acalyptris turcomanicus
Acalyptris vannieukerkeni
Acalyptris vittatus
Alburnoides varentsovi
Bufotes oblongus
Coleophora acompha
Coleophora agasta
Coleophora agathella
Coleophora azyma
Coleophora stylosa
Coleophora sublata
Elachista puplesisi
Micropterix turkmeniella
Ornativalva plutelliformis
Phrynocephalus mystaceus
Plecotus turkmenicus
Scopula kuhitangica
Stigmella ficulnea
Stigmella polymorpha
Strongylognathus minutus
Temnothorax zabelini
Turkmenistan eyelid gecko

Canines
 Central Asian Shepherd Dog

Equines

 List of Central Asian horse breeds
 Akhal-Teke
 Iomud - 
 Turkmenian kulan  
 Turkoman horse

Flora

Aegilops crassa
Allium borszczowii
Anacamptis collina
Bromus sterilis
Callipeltis
Convolvulus erinaceus
Erysimum siliculosum
Euphorbia kopetdaghii
Fritillaria gibbosa
Galium palustre
Haloxylon persicum
Iris acutiloba
Iris acutiloba subsp. lineolata
Iris fosteriana
Iris halophila var. sogdiana
Iris longiscapa
Iris songarica
Iris vicaria
Juniperus polycarpos
Juniperus seravschanica
Lagochilus inebrians
Ophrys
Polygonum heterophyllum
Prunus fenzliana
Prunus scoparia
Prunus turcomanica
Pyrus boissieriana
Sternbergia lutea
Sternbergia vernalis
Typha elephantina
Typha turcomanica

Geography 

Afghanistan–Turkmenistan border
Alaja
Ashgabat Fountain
Bitarap Turkmenistan Avenue 
Climate of Turkmenistan
Darvaza gas crater
Districts of Turkmenistan
Galkynysh Square, Ashgabat
Iran–Turkmenistan border
Khwarazm
Kazakhstan–Turkmenistan border
Saparmurat Turkmenbashi Avenue
Time in Turkmenistan
Trans-Caspia
Turkmenistan–Uzbekistan border

Natural features

Cheleken Peninsula
Karakum Desert
Kyzylkum Desert
Ogurja Ada
Turan Depression

Mountains

Aýrybaba
Balkan Daglary
Gora Arlan
Kopet Dag
Köýtendag Range
Mount Arlan
Uly Balkan

Nature reserves

Amudarya State Nature Reserve 
Badhyz State Nature Reserve 
Bereketli Garagum Nature Reserve 
Gaplaňgyr Nature Reserve 
Hazar State Nature Reserve 
Köpetdag Nature Reserve 
Köýtendag Nature Reserve 
Repetek Biosphere State Reserve 
Sünt-Hasardag Nature Reserve

Sanctuaries

Çemenebit Sanctuary 
Garlyk Sanctuary 
Guryhowdan Sanctuary 
Gyzyljar Sanctuary 
Hojaburjybelent Sanctuary 
Hojagarawul Sanctuary 
Hojapil Sanctuary 
Kelif Sanctuary 
Mäne-Çäçe Sanctuary 
Ogurjaly Sanctuary 
Pulhatyn Sanctuary 
Sarygamyş Sanctuary 
Şasenem Sanctuary 
Sünt-Hasardag Sanctuary

Waterways

Amu Darya
Atrek (Etrek) River
Caspian Sea
Chandyr River
Garabogazköl
Golden Age Lake
Hanhowuz Reservoir
Karakum Canal
Kushk River
Main Turkmen Canal
Murghab River
Sarygamysh Lake
Sumbar River
Tejen River
Türkmenbaşy Gulf
Uzboy River (extinct)

Municipalities

Cities 
Former names, where names have been changed in recent times, are provided in parentheses.

Altyn Asyr
Änew (Anau)
Andalyp (Gurbansoltan eje adyndaky, Ýylanly)
Akdepe
Arkadag
Aşgabat (Ashkhabad)
Bagtyýarlyk District
Berkararlyk District
Bitarap Turkmenistan Avenue 
Büzmeýin (Abadan)
Büzmeýin District
Galkynysh Square, Ashgabat
Gypjak
Independence Square, Ashgabat
Kopetdag District
Magtymguly Avenue
Saparmurat Turkmenbashy Avenue
Babadaýhan (Kirovsk)
Balkanabat (Nebit-dag)
Baýramaly
Bäherden (Baharly)
Bereket (Gazanjyk)
Boldumsaz (Kalinin)
Dänew (Galkynyş)
Darganata (Birata)
Daşoguz (Tashauz, Dashhowuz)
Dostluk (Yuzhnyy)
Esenguly
Etrek (Gyzyletrek)
Farap
Garabekewül
Garabogaz (Bekdaş)
Gazojak
Gökdepe
Görogly (Tagta)
Gubadag
Gyzylarbat (Serdar)
Halaç
Hojambaz
Kaka
 Kerki (Atamyrat)
Köneurgenç
Köýtendag (Çarşaňňy)
Magdanly (Gowurdak)
Magtymguly (Garrygala)
Mary
Murgap
Sakar
Sakarçäge
Saparmyrat Türkmenbaşy adyndaky (Oktyabrsk)
Sarahs
Şatlyk (Şehitli)
Saýat
Serhetabat (Guşgy)
Seýdi (Neftezavodsk)
Shabat (Nyýazow, Täzebazar)
Tejen
Turkmenabat (Çärjew)
Türkmenbaşy (Krasnovodsk)
Awaza
Türkmengala
Ýolöten

Districts

Provinces

Ahal - Balkan - Daşoguz - Lebap - Mary

Towns

Amu Dar'ya (town)
Archman
Bagtyýarlyk şäherçesi (formerly Üçajy)
Döwletli
Dushak
Gumdag
Gyzylgaya
Hazar (Çeleken)
Jebel
Mollanepes
Mukry
Oguzhan (formerly Gulanly)
Ruhubelent
Saparmyrat Türkmenbaşy şäherçesi
Tagtabazar
Türkmenbaşy şäherçesi (formerly Janga)

Villages

Agar
Ajyguýy
Ajyýap
Ak altyn (disambiguation page)
Artyk
Aydere
Burguçy geňeşligi
Çäçe
Çagagüzer (old name)
Çemenabat
Darvaza (Derweze geňeşligi) 
Daýhan
Gämi
Gäwers
Galaýmor
Gyzylbaýyr (formerly Şarlawuk)
Hojagala
Jeňellihatap
Nohur 
Olamsurhy
Sandykgaçy
Ymamnazar

Government

Assembly of Turkmenistan
Cabinet of Ministers (Turkmenistan)
Central Bank of Turkmenistan
List of leaders of Turkmenistan
List of Turkmenistan foreign ministers
Ministry of Communications (Turkmenistan)
Ministry of Culture (Turkmenistan)
Ministry of Energy (Turkmenistan)
Ministry of Finance (Turkmenistan)
Ministry of Foreign Affairs (Turkmenistan)
Ministry of Health (Turkmenistan)
Ministry of Justice (Turkmenistan)
Ministry of Oil and Mineral Resources (Turkmenistan) (abolished)
National Council of Turkmenistan
Oguzhan Presidential Palace
People's Council of Turkmenistan
Politics of Turkmenistan
President of Turkmenistan
Prosecutor General of Turkmenistan
Railways Agency of Turkmenistan
Ruhyýet Palace
Supreme Court of Turkmenistan
Vice President of Turkmenistan
Visa policy of Turkmenistan
Wedding Palace (Ashgabat)

Military and Security 

Armed Forces of Turkmenistan
Chief of the General Staff (Turkmenistan)
Law enforcement in Turkmenistan
Military ranks of Turkmenistan
Ministry of Defense (Turkmenistan)
Ministry of Internal Affairs (Turkmenistan)
Ministry of National Security (Turkmenistan)
Owadan-depe Prison
State Border Service of Turkmenistan
State Customs Service of Turkmenistan
State Migration Service of Turkmenistan
State Security Council of Turkmenistan
Turkmen Air Force 
Turkmen Ground Forces 
Turkmen Internal Troops
Turkmen National Guard
Turkmen Navy
Turkmen State Border Service Institute

Health

COVID-19 pandemic in Turkmenistan

History

Independent Turkmenistan 

2000 Turkmenistan earthquake
2002 renaming of Turkmen months and days of week
List of leaders of Turkmenistan
Prime Minister of Turkmenistan

Soviet Turkmenistan 

Basmachi movement
Communist Party of Turkmenistan
Supreme Soviet of the Turkmen Soviet Socialist Republic
Turkmen Soviet Socialist Republic

Russian Empire 

Battle of Geok Tepe (1879)
Battle of Geok Tepe
Geok Tepe
Great Game
Panjdeh incident
Russian conquest of Central Asia
Russian Turkestan

Pre-Modern 

Bactria–Margiana Archaeological Complex
Chagatai Khanate
Dayahatyn
Dahae
Göktürks
Great Seljuk Empire
Harzemshah Sultanate
Hyrcania
Khanate of Bukhara
Khanate of Khiva
Khwarazm
Konye-Urgench
Margiana
Merv
Nisa, Turkmenistan
Oghuz Turks
Parni
Silk Road
Togolok
Yaz culture

Museums

Ashgabat National Museum of History 
Halk Hakydasy Memorial Complex 
Mary Museum 
The State Museum of the State Cultural Center of Turkmenistan 
Turkmen Carpet Museum 
Turkmen Museum of Fine Arts

Law 

Capital punishment in Turkmenistan 
Constitution of Turkmenistan 
Corruption in Turkmenistan 
Human rights in Turkmenistan 
Human trafficking in Turkmenistan 
Law enforcement in Turkmenistan 
LGBT rights in Turkmenistan 
Polygamy in Turkmenistan 
Prostitution in Turkmenistan 
Supreme Court of Turkmenistan 
Turkmen nationality law

Modern Turkmenistan 

Communications in Turkmenistan 
Foreign relations of Turkmenistan 
International organization membership of Turkmenistan 
List of airports in Turkmenistan 
Military of Turkmenistan 
Public holidays in Turkmenistan 
Red Crescent Society of Turkmenistan 
Scouting in Turkmenistan 
Turkmenistan Airlines 
Transport in Turkmenistan 
Women in Turkmenistan

Architectural Monuments

Archabil Hotel Ashgabat 
Amu Darya Pipeline Bridge 
Ashgabat Cable Car 
Ashgabat Flagpole 
Halk Hakydasy Memorial Complex 
Independence Monument, Ashgabat 
List of tallest structures in Turkmenistan 
Monument to the Constitution 
Neutrality Monument 
Paýtagt Shopping Center 
Ruhyýet Palace 
Turkmenistan Tower 
Yyldyz Hotel

Parks
Ashgabat (park) - Ashgabat Botanical Garden - Halk Hakydasy Memorial Complex - Inspiration Park

People 

 Han Ahmedow 
 Batyr Amanov
 Çarymyrat Amanow
 Gurbannazar Ashirov 
 Ovezgeldy Atayev 
 Aksoltan Ataýewa
 Batyr Atdayev
 Kasymguly Babayev
 Ashyrguly Begliyev
 Begench Beknazarov
 Gurbanguly Berdimuhamedow
 Serdar Berdimuhamedow
 Yaylym Berdiyev
 Batyr Berdiýew
 Annaguly Deryayev
 Shamuhammet Durdylyyev
 Ovezmurat Dykma-Serdar
 Gurbansoltan Eje
 Muhammetnazar Gapurow
 Begench Gundogdyev
 Amanmyrat Hallyyev
 Nury Halmammedov
 Nurmuhammet Hanamow
 Yagshygeldi Kakayev
 Aman Kekilov
 Mämmetweli Kemine
 Berdi Kerbabayev
 Aleksey Kuropatkin
 Gülşat Mämmedowa
 Raşit Meredow
 Shemseddin Mervezi
 Weli Muhadow
 Isgender Mulikov
 Atamyrat Niyazov
 Saparmurat Niyazov
 Akja Nurberdiýewa
 Esenmyrat Orazgeldiyev 
 Danatar Ovezov
 Pavel Poltoratskiy
 Magtymguly Pyragy 
 Maýsa Rejepowa
 Hydyr Saparlyyev
 Medeniyet Shahberdiyeva
 Boris Şyhmyradow
 Mikhail Skobelev
 Täçberdi Tagyýew

Politics 

Agrarian Party of Turkmenistan
Assembly of Turkmenistan
Corruption in Turkmenistan
Democratic Party of Turkmenistan
Elections in Turkmenistan 
Foreign relations of Turkmenistan
Human rights in Turkmenistan
International organization membership of Turkmenistan
List of diplomatic missions in Turkmenistan
List of diplomatic missions of Turkmenistan
National Council of Turkmenistan
People's Council of Turkmenistan
Politics of Turkmenistan
President of Turkmenistan
Republican Party of Turkmenistan
Ruhnama
Supreme Court of Turkmenistan
Turkmenistan parliamentary election, 2008–2009
Turkmenistan presidential election, 2007
2018 Turkmen parliamentary election
2021 Turkmen People's Council election

Religion 

Bahá'í Faith in Turkmenistan 
Catholic Church in Turkmenistan 
Chapel of the Transfiguration, Ashgabat 
Christianity in Turkmenistan 
Eastern Orthodoxy in Turkmenistan
Islam in Turkmenistan 
List of mosques in Turkmenistan 
Pokrovskaya Church 
Protestantism in Turkmenistan 
Religion in Turkmenistan 
Ruhnama 
St. Alexander Nevsky Church, Ashgabat

Major mosques

Daşoguz Mosque 
Ertuğrul Gazi Mosque 
Gurbanguly Hajji Mosque 
Hazret Omar Mosque 
Lebap Region Mosque 
Saparmurat Hajji Mosque 
Türkmenbaşy Ruhy Mosque

Sports 

Ahmet Ataýew
Ashgabat Stadium 
Ashgabat Indoor Tennis Arena 
Ashgabat Main Indoor Arena 
Ashgabat Velodrome
Asian Indoor and Martial Arts Games 
Begençmuhammet Kulyýew
List of Turkmenistan records in Olympic weightlifting 
Begençmyrat Myradow
Nusaý Stadium
Maýsa Rejepowa
Saparmurat Turkmenbashy Olympic Stadium 
Scouting in Turkmenistan 
Turkmenistan at the Deaflympics 
Turkmenistan at the Youth Olympics 
Turkmenistan Cup 
Turkmenistan Higher League 
Turkmenistan national football team 
Turkmenistan Super Cup

See also 

Outline of Turkmenistan

Turkmenistan